Dietmar Erler (born 7 April 1947) is a German former professional footballer who played as a midfielder. After two seasons each with Arminia Bielefeld and Borussia Dortmund Erler transferred to Eintracht Braunschweig, where he spent most of his career. After 11 seasons with Braunschweig, in which he played a total of 299 games (scoring 61 goals) in all competitions, Erler retired from football and became a school teacher for sports, mathematics, and geography.

References

1947 births
Living people
Sportspeople from Bielefeld
Footballers from North Rhine-Westphalia
Association football midfielders
German footballers
Germany under-21 international footballers
Eintracht Braunschweig players
Arminia Bielefeld players
Borussia Dortmund players
Bundesliga players
2. Bundesliga players